Keith Kirby (born 1 October 1939), a right-arm leg-spinner, is an Australian former cricketer. He played 25 first-class cricket matches for Victoria between 1961 and 1970. Kirby played in Victorian Premier Cricket for Essendon from 1959—60 to 1981—82. In 262 matches he took 623 wickets, still the all-time record for the Bombers.

See also
 List of Victoria first-class cricketers
 The 1965-66 Victorian District Cricket final

References

External links
 
 

1939 births
Living people
Australian cricketers
Victoria cricketers
Cricketers from Melbourne